New Durham Township is one of twenty-one townships in LaPorte County, Indiana. As of the 2010 census, its population was 8,664 and it contained 2,396 housing units.

History
An early settler being a native of Durham, New York, caused the name to be selected.

The Pinhook Methodist Church and Cemetery was listed in the National Register of Historic Places in 2009.

Geography

Education
New Durham Township is served by the Westville-New Durham Township Public Library. Township residents may also request a free library card from any La Porte County Public Library branch.

References

External links
 Indiana Township Association
 United Township Association of Indiana

Townships in LaPorte County, Indiana
Townships in Indiana